Félix Théophile Pierre Ghysels (born 10 February 1880, date of death unknown) was a French gymnast. He competed in the men's individual all-around event at the 1900 Summer Olympics.

References

External links

1880 births
Year of death missing
French male artistic gymnasts
Olympic gymnasts of France
Gymnasts at the 1900 Summer Olympics
Sportspeople from Roubaix
Place of death missing